Aires de Saldanha (Santarém, Portugal, 10 May 1542 - Terceira, 19 August 1605) was a Portuguese military. He was the son of António de Saldanha, military and navigator who discovered the bay of Saldanha. He went to Portuguese India in 1558, with the viceroy Constantino of Braganza, this time serving for twelve years in the region.

Captain and Governor 
He returned to Portugal in 1570, where he married Joana de Albuquerque, soon after he returned to India, this time with the Viceroy Rui Lourenço de Távora. He was appointed captain of Portuguese Malacca, where he built the fort of Tidor. Returning to Portugal, he was appointed governor of Tangier, a position he held for 9 years.

Viceroy 
In 1600, he was named 17th Viceroy of India and 34th Governor of India. During his viceroyalty, in addition to financial difficulties, had to struggle against the Dutch on several fronts, defending Cochim and Goa, and repel them in the Moluccas.

Death 
He died during his return to Portugal, near the island of Terceira, being first buried in Angra do Heroísmo, after his body was moved to Santarém.

Viceroys of Portuguese India
Portuguese colonial governors and administrators
Portuguese nobility
16th-century Portuguese people
1542 births
1605 deaths
People from Santarém, Portugal
Governors of Tangier